SM U-63 was one of the 329 submarines serving in the Imperial German Navy in World War I.
U-63 was engaged in naval warfare and took part in the First Battle of the Atlantic.

Summary of raiding history

References

Notes

Citations

Bibliography

Type U 63 submarines
World War I submarines of Germany
1916 ships
Ships built in Kiel
U-boats commissioned in 1916